Side 3 is the third album from the Raspberries, released in 1973 (see 1973 in music). The album cover is diecut like a basket of Raspberries, with the group's name placed at the top of the LP sleeve. Three singles were released from the album: "Tonight" / "Hard to Get Over a Heartbreak", which reached number 69 on the US Billboard Hot 100 and number 37 on the Cash Box chart; "I'm a Rocker", which reached number 94 on Billboard and number 75 on Cash Box; and a third single, "Ecstasy", which did not chart on Billboard but reached number 116 on Cash Box. Cash Box called "Ecstasy" a "melodic gem" with an "appetizing mixture of smooth harmony and driving rhythm" and a "superb lead guitar break."  Record World said of "Ecstasy" that "With vocal harmonies reminiscent of Beatle days and gutsy, driving guitar work, this Jimmy Jenner-produced masterpiece is a monster from the word go" and that the "tune molds vocals and instrumentals in a manner that belies its hard rock sound." The album itself reached number 138 on the US albums chart.

This album was re-released on CD as part of the Power Pop Vol. 2, also containing their fourth album Starting Over.

"Tonight" was later recorded by glam metal band Mötley Crüe for their 1981 album Too Fast for Love, but the track was left out of the initial release (it later appeared in the 1999 reissue and later versions).

Track listing

Personnel
Eric Carmen – rhythm guitar, lead and backing vocals, piano
Wally Bryson – lead guitar, backing and lead vocals
Dave Smalley – bass, backing and lead vocals
Jim Bonfanti – drums, backing vocals

References

Raspberries (band) albums
1973 albums
Albums produced by Jimmy Ienner
Albums recorded at Record Plant (New York City)
Capitol Records albums